Samson Kayo (born 1991 or 1992) is a British actor, comedian, producer and writer. He was nominated for the British Academy Television Award for Best Male Comedy Performance in 2018 for the BBC sketch show Famalam and in 2022 for the Sky One sitcom Bloods, which he created and wrote. He also created and stars in Sliced, and his other credits include Youngers, Timewasters,  and Our Flag Means Death.

Biography
Kayo is of Nigerian descent. He said that growing up in Peckham, he only wanted to be a footballer, but developed an interest in comedy through Jim Carrey, Robin Williams, and British comedian Jocelyn Jee Esien, who inspired him as a black person to enter comedy. He was a childhood friend of John Boyega, with whom he attended church. When he went out to pick up an iron for his mother, he found an open audition for the Channel 4 comedy Youngers, and was cast.

Kayo was nominated for Best Male Comedy Performance at the 2018 British Academy Television Awards for his part in the BBC sketch show Famalam. From 2017 to 2019, he was part of the main cast of the ITV2 sitcom Timewasters, in which a Black British jazz quartet are transported through time to the London of the 1920s and 1950s in each series. He is the creator, writer and lead of the takeaway-based sitcom Sliced on Dave since 2019. He also created and plays the lead Maleek on paramedic-focused sitcom Bloods, which debuted on Sky One in 2021 while being based on an eight-minute short film on Sky Arts. He was nominated for Best Male Comedy Performance at the 2022 British Academy Television Awards for this role.

In 2020, Kayo featured in Nick Frost and Simon Pegg's horror comedy series Truth Seekers. A year later, he starred in David Jenkins and Taika Waititi's pirate-based romantic comedy series Our Flag Means Death, which was produced in the United States. He told The Irish Times that although many British actors of colour found more opportunity in the United States, he was committed to making more British series.

Filmography

Film

Television

References

External links

1990s births
Living people
Black British male actors
People from Peckham
English male film actors
English male television actors
English male voice actors
21st-century English male actors
British comedy actors
English comedy writers
English people of Nigerian descent